Walter W. Miller (October 19, 1883 – March 1, 1956) was a pitcher in Major League Baseball. He pitched for the Brooklyn Dodgers in three games during the 1911 baseball season.

External links

1883 births
1956 deaths
Baseball players from Indiana
Major League Baseball pitchers
Brooklyn Dodgers players
People from Marion, Indiana
Anderson Orphans players
Grand Rapids Orphans players
Grand Rapids Wolverines players
Fort Wayne Billikens players
Newark Indians players
Atlanta Crackers players
Elmira Colonels players
Erie Sailors players
Grand Rapids Black Sox players